Rugby Road–University Corner Historic District is a national historic district located at Charlottesville, Virginia. The district encompasses 173 contributing buildings in the city of Charlottesville. It includes a variety of commercial, residential, and institutional structures mirroring the University of Virginia's development between the 1890s and the Great Depression. It includes properties on Carr's Hill. Notable buildings include the Chancellor Building (1920), the Minor Court Building (1896 and 1927), Mincer's Shop Building 1920s), the Stevens-Shepherd Building (c. 1925), Buckingham Palace (c. 1850s), St. Paul's Episcopal Church (1926–27), Madison Hall (1905), fraternity houses dating from 1902 to 1928, Fayerweather Hall (1893), the Bayly Museum (1934), Faculty Apartments building (c. 1920), Watts-Hillel House (1913-1914), and Hotopp-Watson House (1900).  Also located in the district are the separately listed Anderson Brothers Building, Preston Court Apartments, and Wynhurst.

It was listed on the National Register of Historic Places in 1984.

References

External links
Buckingham Palace, Carr's Hill, University of Virginia Campus, Charlottesville, Charlottesville, VA: 3 measured drawings and 10 data pages at Historic American Buildings Survey

Historic American Buildings Survey in Virginia
Historic districts on the National Register of Historic Places in Virginia
Buildings and structures in Charlottesville, Virginia
National Register of Historic Places in Charlottesville, Virginia